Hyndland Parish Church also known as The Kingsborough Sanctuary, is a 19th-century church located in the Hyndland area of Glasgow.

History
Hyndland Parish Church was founded with the development of the Hyndland area into residential living in the late 1800s. The original church consisted of a tin church which stood directly opposite the site of the present church. The current church was built in the Neo-Gothic style, on designs by William Leiper, and was built between 1886 and 1887. It was built in a cruciform, with a nave, aisles, transepts and chancel.

In 2017, Hyndland Parish Church was united with Broomhill Parish Church to form Broomhill Hyndland Parish Church, with the Broomhill building serving as the main place of worship. Hyndland Parish Church was renamed The Kingsborough Sanctuary and today also serves as a concert hall, in addition to being a place of worship.

Works of Art
The church contains an original 1887 Henry Willis organ which consists of three manuals and thirty one speaking stops. The church also possess a notable collection of stained glass windows by Norman Macdougall (1889), Douglas Strachan (1921), Douglas Hamilton (1930), Gordon Webster (1961), William Wilson (1962), Sax Shaw (1968), Paul Lucky (1984) and Rab MacInnes (1999). There are also another three windows by Oscar Paterson made in 1897 which were installed in the church after being moved from the now demolished St Bride's Church, in Partick.

References

Churches completed in 1887
Church of Scotland churches in Glasgow
Listed churches in Glasgow
Category A listed buildings in Glasgow
1887 establishments in Scotland
19th-century Church of Scotland church buildings